Soum is one of the 45 provinces of Burkina Faso, located in its Sahel Region.

Its capital is Djibo.

Departments
Soum is divided into 9 departments:

See also
Regions of Burkina Faso
Provinces of Burkina Faso
Departments of Burkina Faso

References

 
Provinces of Burkina Faso